Koros may refer to:

 Koros (mythology), a Greek mythological figure
 Kipsengeret Koros (born 1979), Kenyan politician
 Lily Koros Tare (born 1973), Kenyan medical administrator
 Körös (disambiguation)
 Kőrös (disambiguation)
 Kórós, a village in Hungary
 KOROS or Korea Rolling Stock Corporation, a South Korean machinery company

See also
 Koro (disambiguation)